Ohio City may refer to a place in the United States:

Ohio City, Colorado, an unincorporated town in Gunnison County
Ohio City, Ohio, a village in Van Wert County
Ohio City, Cleveland, a neighborhood of Cleveland, Ohio